This was the first edition of the tournament.

Mihaela Buzărnescu won the title, defeating Eri Hozumi in the final, 6–1, 6–0.

Seeds

Draw

Finals

Top half

Bottom half

References
Main Draw

TEB Kültürpark Cup - Singles